Naturalist is an autobiography by naturalist, entomologist, and sociobiologist Edward O. Wilson first published in 1994 by Island Press.  In it he writes on his childhood and the beginnings of his interest in biology, on his work in entomology and myrmecology, on his work with biogeography, and on several of his writings including on his controversial work Sociobiology: The New Synthesis (1975), as well as several other subjects.  It was awarded the 1995 Los Angeles Times book prize for Science and Technology publication.

In 2020, a graphic novel version was published, adapted by Jim Ottaviani and C.M. Butzer.

References

External links
 Official publisher's website

1994 non-fiction books
American biographies
English-language books
Science autobiographies
Works by E. O. Wilson
2020 graphic novels
Island Press books